"My Love" is a song by British singer Will Young. It was written by Young and Kish Mauve members Mima Stilwell and Jim Elliott for his seventh studio album Lexicon (2019), while production was helmed by Richard X. The second single to precede Lexicon, it was released by Cooking Vinyl on 24 May 2019 and reached number 45 on the UK Singles Downloads Chart. A remix single, featuring additional production by underground tech house duo The Last Indigo and James "F9" Wiltshire, was issued on 7 June 2019.

Background
"All the Songs" was written by Young along with frequent collaborators, Kish Mauve members Mima Stilwell and Jim Elliott. Production on the track was helmed by Richard X with whom Young had previously worked on his fifth studio Echoes (2011). Speaking about the song, Young told Attitude: "When we were writing, I kept thinking of the chequered floors of a disco. That’s what was in my head. And it’s slightly Jamiroquai, I think."

Critical reception
Gay Times described "My Love" as "a dancefloor-ready heartbreak banger." In her review of parent album Lexicon, musicOMH critic Helen Clarke called "My Love" a "brassy pop song, and this is where [Young] thrives."

Chart performance
"My Love" debuted at number 91 on the UK Singles Downloads Chart in the week of 6 June 2019. It eventually peaked at number 45 in the week ending 4 July 2019.

Music video
Young reteamed with photographer and director Rankin, director of the music video for his previous single "All the Songs" (2019), to film a video "My Love." Released on 12 June 2019, it was shot on Worthing Pier in Worthing, West Sussex, England in May 2019. Young described the visuals as a "Northern Soul-inspired thing that I’ve wanted to do for ages. Rankin’s just fantastic to collaborate with."

Track listing
All tracks written by Jim Elliott, Mima Stilwell, and Will Young.

Notes
 signifies an additional producer

Credits and personnel
 Jim Eliot – writer
 Pete Hofmann – mixing
 Alex Maedows – bass guitar
 Mima Stilwell – writer
 Richard X – mixing, producer
 Will Young – vocals, writer

Charts

Release history

References

Will Young songs
2019 songs
2019 singles
Songs written by Will Young
Songs written by Jim Eliot
Songs written by Mima Stilwell